Wadhawan (also spelled as Wadhavan, Wadhwa Wadhaun or Wadhwani) is a Punjabi Khatri surname. Among the Khatris, it is a part of the "Bahri" sub-caste. The Wadhawan Khatris owned several villages in Gujrat district of Punjab. Bhai Gurdas, the first Jathedar of Akal Takth, mentioned about Wadhawan Khatris present in Burhanpur.

Notable people 

 Anup Wadhawan, IAS Officer who served as Commerce Secretary to the Government of India
 Avinash Wadhawan, Indian actor
 Kanhaiya Wadhawan, Indian cricketer

References

Surnames
Indian surnames
Punjabi-language surnames
Surnames of Indian origin
Hindu surnames
Khatri clans
Khatri surnames